The People's Climate Movement (PCM) is a coalition of civil society organizations, including environmental and religious organizations, trade unions and social justice groups, in the United States of America that advocates for political and social change to reverse or mitigate the effects of climate change. PCM emphasizes the inclusion of underrepresented groups, job creation and economic prosperity.  Since 2014, PCM has organized marches in the United States to raise awareness and demand action on climate issues. In 2018, PCM led the "Rise for Climate, Jobs and Justice March" in San Francisco with over 30,000 participants, while organizing several more events throughout the United States.

Founding 
A major impetus for the march was President Trump’s withdrawal from the international Paris Agreement in 2015, through which he indicated that the United States would not be obligated to reduce the environmental impact of its industrial production, or work to keep the global temperature rise under two degrees Celsius. Scientists and political leaders strongly advised against leaving the Paris Agreement, with multiple reports from global scientific communities providing data for the dangers of rising global temperatures. Under the Trump administration, EPA workers claimed the department had failed to properly regulate companies that violated emissions standards. New rules in the department kept regulators from conducting air and water pollution standards tests, allowing companies' environmentally harmful decisions to go unchecked to a greater extent than under the previous administration. This led to a significant decrease in punitive fees assessed by the EPA compared to recent other administrations 

The People's Climate Movement Organization started in 2014 with the Peoples Climate March in New York and the National Day of Action in 2015. These two events built the foundation of the organization; since then, they have organized climate events around the world.

Platform 
The platform of the People's Climate Movement includes the following demands:
 100% Clean and Renewable Future 
 Economic Opportunity for Everyone
 Prioritizing a Just Resilience, Relief and Recovery
 Union Wages that Support a Family 
 Pollution-Free Communities and Workplaces
 Protection of Workers

Planning techniques 
Planning and executing a march with over 220,000 attendees presents significant difficulties and complex considerations to the organizing party. To maximize their impact, the organizers relied heavily on 2 tactics: mass mobilization and movement alignment.

Mass mobilization is the ability to motivate large crowds to converge upon one location with one goal as a unified force. It serves as an indicator of the importance of the movement while also being an ideal visual for press releases and coverage of the movement. A key element of mass mobilization is the use of social media. The possibility of information disseminated on social media “going viral” makes it a great tool for sharing information about a social movement or organizing a specific event. The 2017 march was organized using a two-level approach. At the top, there is a social media page for the leaders of the People's Climate Movement itself. Additionally, each city has its own separate page to share details pertaining to the action in that specific area. This approached allowed PCM to present one overarching goal to each attendee while also streamlining the process of organization by delegating geographically dependent tasks to other individuals, maintaining separate social media pages.

Feeding into and supplementing their mass mobilization strategy is movement alignment, the concept of increasing one's impact by unifying other groups or social movements that are formally unaffiliated but working towards an identical or similar goal. Movement alignment differs from mass mobilization as it refers to a technique used to unify movements and organizations rather than individuals.

Response and impact 
In response to President Trump's withdrawal from the Paris Agreement, and public action in the form of the nationwide climate marches, 11 states pledged to follow the Paris Agreement's terms independently. This federal rollback of regulation allowed states to have more autonomy over their emissions standards and freed them from any obligation that they had to comply with international standards. The People's Climate Movement has garnered support from numerous other organizations, fulfilling their goal of movement alignment. Some of these supporting organizations include the Sierra Club, the Alliance for Climate Education, and the US Climate Action Network.

PCM has influenced movements not affiliated with large organizations, as well. Inspired by 16 year old Swedish climate activist Greta Thunberg, students around the world responded to the lack of action on combating climate change by starting a global movement known as 'Youth Strike 4 Climate' or 'Fridays For Future' in which students walked out of school on Friday in protest. Their mission was to raise awareness about the catastrophic consequences of global climate change.

Criticism 
PCM has been cast by some as too friendly to corporations that were viewed by other activists as part of the problem rather than the solution. Especially among the far left, the movement was viewed as not impactful enough to drive meaningful policy change. One commentator, for example, believed that real resistance would only come from “those willing to breach police barricades”. Relatedly, the People's Climate Marches have been accused of being merely symbolic with no real plan to address the issues contributing to climate change.

References 

Climate change organizations based in the United States
Environmental organizations based in the United States
Climate change in the United States